The 1961 Chicago Bears season was their 42nd regular season completed in the National Football League. The team finished with an 8–6 record under George Halas, which was an improvement over the 5–6–1 record of the previous season.

Offseason 
On January 14, Chicago Bears End Willard Dewveall played out his option and joined the Houston Oilers of the American Football League. He became the first player to move deliberately from one league to another.

The Bears were notable for taking part in an exhibition game in their first ever game outside of the United States, taking on the CFL's Montreal Alouettes (the original team), winning 34–16.

Roster

Regular season

Schedule

Game summaries

Week 1

Week 2

Week 3

Week 4

Week 5

Week 6

Week 7

Week 8

Week 9

Week 10

Week 11

Week 12

Week 13

Week 14

Standings

References 

Chicago Bears
Chicago Bears seasons
Chicago Bears